Pseudanodonta is a genus of freshwater mussels, aquatic bivalve mollusks in the family Unionidae, the river mussels.

Species
Species within this genus include:
 Pseudanodonta complanata (Rossmässler, 1835)
 Pseudanodonta middendorffi (Siemaschko, 1848): synonym of Pseudanodonta complanata (Rossmässler, 1835)

References

 Servain, G. (1888). Aperçu sur la faune des mollusques fluviatiles des environs de Hambourg. Bulletins de la Société Malacologique de France, 5: 287-340, pl. 8-9. Paris
 Lopes-Lima, M. et al. (2017). Conservation status of freshwater mussels in Europe: state of the art and future challenges. Biological Reviews, 92 (1): 572-607. Cambridge

External links
 Bourguignat, J.-R. (1877). Descriptions de deux nouveaux genres algériens, suivies d'une classification des familles et des genres de mollusques terrestres et fluviatiles du système européen. Bulletin de la Société des Sciences Physiques et Naturelles de Toulouse. 3
 Servain, G. (1891). Des Acéphales Lamellibranches fluviatiles du Système Européen. Bulletins de la Société Malacologique de France. 7: 281-323, pl. 5-7. Paris
 Locard, A. (1890). Catalogue des espèces françaises appartenant aux genres Pseudanodonta et Anodonta connues jusqu'a ce jour. Contributions à la faune malacologique française [XIV: 1-240. Paris: Baillière. Published slightly later (1890) in the Annales de la Société Linnéenne de Lyon, (N.S.) 36: 50-284]
 Bolotov, I. N.; Kondakov, A. V.; Konopleva, E. S.; Vikhrev, I. V.; Aksenova, O. V.; Aksenov, A. S.; Bespalaya, Y. V.; Borovskoy, A. V.; Danilov, P. P.; Dvoryankin, G. A.; Gofarov, M. Y.; Kabakov, M. B.; Klishko, O. K.; Kolosova, Y. S.; Lyubas, A. A.; Novoselov, A. P.; Palatov, D. M.; Savvinov, G. N.; Solomonov, N. M.; Spitsyn, V. M.; Sokolova, S. E.; Tomilova, A. A.; Froufe, E.; Bogan, A. E.; Lopes-Lima, M.; Makhrov, A. A.; Vinarski, M. V. (2020). Integrative taxonomy, biogeography and conservation of freshwater mussels (Unionidae) in Russia. Scientific Reports. 10(1)

Unionidae
Bivalve genera
Taxa named by Jules René Bourguignat